

Crown
Head of state (monarch) – Queen Elizabeth II

Federal government
Governor General – Michaëlle Jean then David Johnston

Cabinet
28th Canadian Ministry

Prime Minister – Stephen Harper
Minister of Finance – Jim Flaherty
Minister of Foreign Affairs – Lawrence Cannon
Minister of International Trade
Stockwell Day (to January 19)
Peter Van Loan (from January 19)
Minister of National Defence – Peter MacKay
Minister of Health – Leona Aglukkaq
Minister of Industry – Tony Clement
Minister of National Revenue
 Jean-Pierre Blackburn (to January 19)
 Keith Ashfield (from January 19)
Minister of Heritage – Josée Verner
Minister of Intergovernmental Affairs – Josée Verner
Minister of the Environment
Jim Prentice (to November 5)
John Baird (from November 7)
Leader of the Government in the House of Commons (House Leader)
Jay Hill (to August 6)
John Baird (from August 6)
Minister of Justice – Rob Nicholson
Minister of Transport
John Baird (to August 6)
Chuck Strahl (from August 6)
Minister of Labour
Rona Ambrose (to January 19)
Lisa Raitt (from January 19)
Minister of Canadian Heritage – James Moore
Minister of Citizenship and Immigration – Jason Kenney
Minister of Indian Affairs and Northern Development
Chuck Strahl (to August 6)
John Duncan (from August 6)
Minister of Veterans Affairs
Greg Thompson (to January 16)
Jean-Pierre Blackburn (from January 19)
Minister of Fisheries and Oceans – Gail Shea
Minister of Agriculture and Agri-Food – Gerry Ritz
Minister of Public Works and Government Services
Christian Paradis (to January 19)
Rona Ambrose (from January 19)
Minister of Public Safety
Peter Van Loan (to January 19)
Vic Toews (from January 19)
President of the Treasury Board
Vic Toews (to January 19)
Stockwell Day (from January 19)
Minister of Natural Resources
Lisa Raitt (to January 19)
Christian Paradis (from January 19)
Minister of Human Resources and Skills Development – Diane Finley
Minister of Western Economic Diversification
Jim Prentice (to November 5)
Rona Ambrose (from November 5)
Minister for International Cooperation – Bev Oda

Parliament
See: 40th Canadian parliament

Party leaders

Liberal Party of Canada – Michael Ignatieff
Conservative Party of Canada – Stephen Harper
Bloc Québécois – Gilles Duceppe
New Democratic Party – Jack Layton
Green Party of Canada – Elizabeth May

Other

Speaker of the Senate – Noël Kinsella
Speaker of the House of Commons – Peter Milliken
Governor of the Bank of Canada – Mark Carney
Chief of the Defence Staff – General Walter J. Natynczyk

Supreme Court justices
Chief Justice: Beverley McLachlin
Marshall Rothstein
Michel Bastarache
William Ian Corneil Binnie
Louis LeBel
Marie Deschamps
Morris Fish
Louise Charron
Rosalie Abella

Provinces and territories

Commissioners
Commissioner of Yukon
Geraldine Van Bibber (to November 30)
Doug Phillips (acting from November 30 to December 17; Commissioner thereafter)
Commissioners of Northwest Territories
Tony Whitford (to April 28)
Margaret Thom (acting)
George Tuccaro (from May 28)
Commissioners of Nunavut
Ann Meekitjuk Hanson (to April 10)
Nellie Kusugak (acting)
Edna Elias (from May 31)

Lieutenant governors
Lieutenant Governor of Alberta
Norman Kwong (to May 11)
Donald Ethell (from May 11)
Lieutenant Governor of British Columbia – Steven Point
Lieutenant Governor of Manitoba – Philip S. Lee
Lieutenant Governor of New Brunswick – Graydon Nicholas
Lieutenant Governor of Newfoundland and Labrador – John Crosbie
Lieutenant Governor of Nova Scotia – Mayann Francis
Lieutenant Governor of Ontario – David Onley
Lieutenant Governor of Prince Edward Island – Barbara Hagerman
Lieutenant Governor of Quebec – Pierre Duchesne
Lieutenant Governor of Saskatchewan – Gordon Barnhart

Premiers
Premier of Alberta – Ed Stelmach
Premier of British Columbia – Gordon Campbell
Premier of Manitoba – Greg Selinger
Premier of New Brunswick
Shawn Graham (to October 12)
David Alward (from October 12)
Premier of Newfoundland and Labrador
Danny Williams (to December 3)
Kathy Dunderdale (from December 3)
Premier of Nova Scotia – Darrell Dexter
Premier of Ontario – Dalton McGuinty
Premier of Prince Edward Island – Robert Ghiz
Premier of Quebec – Jean Charest
Premier of Saskatchewan – Brad Wall
Premier of the Northwest Territories – Floyd Roland
Premier of Nunavut – Eva Aariak
Premier of Yukon – Dennis Fentie

Mayors
see also list of mayors in Canada
Calgary – Dave Bronconnier
Charlottetown – Clifford J. Lee
Edmonton – Stephen Mandel
Fredericton – Brad Woodside
Halifax – Peter J. Kelly
Iqaluit – Elisapee Sheutiapik then Madeleine Redfern
Ottawa – Larry O'Brien then Jim Watson
Quebec City – Régis Labeaume
Regina – Pat Fiacco
St. John's – Dennis O'Keefe
Toronto – David Miller then Rob Ford
Vancouver – Gregor Robertson
Victoria – Dean Fortin
Whitehorse – Bev Buckway
Winnipeg – Sam Katz
Yellowknife – Gordon Van Tighem

Religious leaders
Roman Catholic Archbishop of Quebec and Primate of Canada – Cardinal Archbishop Marc Ouellet
Roman Catholic Archbishop of Montreal –  Cardinal Archbishop Jean-Claude Turcotte
Roman Catholic Bishops of London – Bishop Ronald Peter Fabbro
Roman Catholic Archbishop of Toronto –  Archbishop Thomas Christopher Collins
Primate of the Anglican Church of Canada –  Fred Hiltz
Moderator of the United Church of Canada – David Giuliano
Moderator of the Presbyterian Church in Canada –  Wilma Welsh
National Bishop of the Evangelical Lutheran Church in Canada –  Raymond Schultz

Peer
Michael Grant, 12th Baron de Longueuil

See also
 2009 Canadian incumbents
 Events in Canada in 2010
 Canadian incumbents by year

2010
Incumbents
Canadian leaders